The yellow ground squirrel (Spermophilus fulvus) is a large and sturdy ground squirrel species native to Afghanistan, China, Iran, Kazakhstan, Turkmenistan, Uzbekistan and Russia. It inhabits sandy steppes with Artemisia, glasswort and tamarisk.

The yellow ground squirrel has naked soles on the hind feet excluding heels. It lives in large colonies, is strictly diurnal and forages mainly in the morning when the vegetation is still damp. Its diet includes bulbs, seeds, stems and leaves. It hibernates, but it may also aestivate.

References

Spermophilus
Mammals of Afghanistan
Mammals of the Middle East
Mammals described in 1823
Taxonomy articles created by Polbot